Kevin G. Youngblood (born November 22, 1980) is a former professional American football wide receiver in the National Football League. He played with the Atlanta Falcons in 2006.

He now lives in the Washington, DC metro area and works for the United States Secret Service.

References

External links
Pro-Football reference

1980 births
Living people
William M. Raines High School alumni
Players of American football from Jacksonville, Florida
American football wide receivers
Clemson Tigers football players
Atlanta Falcons players
Georgia Force players
Tampa Bay Buccaneers players
Carolina Panthers players